Sediminibacterium ginsengisoli is a Gram-negative, non-spore-forming, facultatively anaerobic and motile bacterium from the genus of Sediminibacterium which has been isolated from soil from a ginseng field from Pocheon in Korea.

References

Chitinophagia
Bacteria described in 2013